Bevic Moussiti-Oko (born 28 January 1995) is a Congolese professional footballer who plays as a forward for Turkish club Ankaragücü and the Congo national team.

Club career
Moussiti-Oko had a successful spell with Dunkerque in the Championnat National, and transferred to Le Havre of Ligue 2 in 2017. He made his professional debut for Le Havre in a 1–1 Ligue 2 tie with Orléans on 8 September 2017.

In January 2019, Moussiti-Oko moved on loan to Quevilly-Rouen. He left Le Havre for Le Mans, newly promoted to Ligue 2, in June 2019.

On 1 February 2023, Moussiti-Oko signed a year-and-a-half-long contract with Ankaragücü in Turkey.

International career
In 2015, Moussiti-Oko made his debut for Congo's under-20 at the 2015 African U-20 Championship, making 2 appearances.

Moussiti-Oko was called up the Congo senior team in May 2017 for a 2018 African Nations Championship qualification match against the DR Congo. He made his senior debut on 10 October 2019 as a second-half substitute in a friendly against Thailand that ended as a 1–1 draw.

References

External links

AFCON Profile

1995 births
Sportspeople from Brazzaville
Living people
Republic of the Congo footballers
Association football forwards
Republic of the Congo international footballers
Republic of the Congo under-20 international footballers
USL Dunkerque players
Le Havre AC players
US Quevilly-Rouen Métropole players
Le Mans FC players
AC Ajaccio players
MKE Ankaragücü footballers
Ligue 1 players
Ligue 2 players
Championnat National players
Championnat National 2 players
Süper Lig players
Republic of the Congo expatriate footballers
Republic of the Congo expatriate sportspeople in France
Expatriate footballers in France
Republic of the Congo expatriate sportspeople in Turkey
Expatriate footballers in Turkey